Illinois Route 3 (IL 3) is a  major north–south arterial state highway in southwestern Illinois.

Route description
The majority of IL 3 has four lanes from Waterloo to Godfrey, with brief six-lane stretches from the entrance to the McKinley Bridge in Venice to near the River's Edge area (formerly the Army Depot) in Granite City and near Alton Square Mall in Alton, as well as a brief two-laned section between its separation from I-55, I-64, and US 40 in East St. Louis and Venice. It is also two-laned the majority of the southern part from Waterloo to Cairo near areas of the Shawnee National Forest, as well as the northern portion from Godfrey to Grafton. It briefly overlaps IL 111 at Alton, I-255 and US 50, and IL 127 north of Cache.

IL 3 parallels the Mississippi River for the entire length of its journey, and it carries the Illinois portion of the Great River Road for most of its length. South of St. Louis, I-55 is its parallel on the west side of the river, along with US 61. The road runs along many historical sites along the Mississippi River, and is the closest Illinois state highway to the old state capital of Kaskaskia.

History

Original 1918 route
The original IL 3 route went from Chester in southern Illinois to Morrison in northwest Illinois via Rock Island.  With the completion of highway bridges over the Mississippi River (e.g. Clark Bridge at Alton) U.S. Route 67 (US 67) was extended from St. Louis to Godfrey and replaced the original IL 3 to Rock Island.  Today, this route is still the major north–south corridor for western Illinois—and the only major Illinois north–south route never upgraded to the Interstate Highway System like I-57, I-55, or I-39.

Current route
On August 4, 1976, the new Berm Highway from Wood River to Alton was opened. It was signed as IL 3, which left the old alignment on Lewis and Clark Boulevard and Broadway unmarked.  However, on June 29, 1987, the Illinois Department of Transportation (IDOT) built the new Madison Avenue extension in Wood River and marked that road and the Berm Highway as IL 143 and truncated IL 3 at IL 143 (highway signage and IDOT planning maps suggested otherwise, however).  This new terminus for Route 3 was short-lived, however.

On November 26, 1987, a new section of Homer M. Adams Parkway in Alton opened to traffic, and IL 3 was extended onto Lewis and Clark Boulevard (a former IL 3 alignment) back into Alton and onto the extension. IL 3 was then cosigned with IL 111 until the intersection with Godfrey Road, where IL 3 takes over the former IL 100 alignment.

Major intersections

References

External links

 Illinois Highway Ends: Illinois Route 3

003
Illinois 003
003
Transportation in Alexander County, Illinois
Transportation in Union County, Illinois
Transportation in Jackson County, Illinois
Transportation in Randolph County, Illinois
Transportation in Monroe County, Illinois
Transportation in St. Clair County, Illinois
Transportation in Madison County, Illinois
Transportation in Jersey County, Illinois